(I have found David), WAB 19, is a sacred motet composed by Anton Bruckner in 1868.

History 
Bruckner composed the motet on 21 April 1868 at the end of his stay in Linz. The first performance occurred on 10 May 1868 as offertory of a mass of Antonio Lotti.

The manuscript is archived at the Linzer Singakademie (Frohsinn-archive). The motet was first published in band III/2, pp. 239–244 of the Göllerich/Auer biography.

Music 
The text is taken from Psalm 89.
{|
|
|style="padding-left:2em;"|I have found David, my servant;
I have anointed him with my holy oil.
For my hand shall aid him
and my arm shall strengthen him.
Alleluia.
|}

The work is a setting of 46 bars in F minor for  choir and 4 trombones.

The last 16 bars consist of an Alleluja, for which Bruckner drew his inspiration from the Hallelujah of Händel's Messiah, on which he often improvised on the organ.

Discography 
The first recording occurred in 1959:
 Martin Koekelkoren, Mastreechter Staar, Royal Male Choir Mastreechter Staar – 45 rpm: Philips 402 155 NE

Other recordings:
 Joachim Martini, Junge Kantorei, Geistliche Chormusik der Romantik – LP: Schwarzwald MPS 13004, 1970
 Martin Flämig, Dresdner Kreuzchor, Ave Maria – Anton Bruckner: Geistliche Chöre-Motets – CD: Capriccio 10 081, 1985
 Hans-Christoph Rademann, NDR Chor Hamburg, Anton Bruckner: Ave Maria – CD: Carus 83.151, 2000
 Dan-Olof Stenlund, Malmö Kammarkör, Bruckner: Ausgewählte Werke - CD: Malmö Kammarkör MKKCD 051, 2004
 Michael Stenov, Cantores Carmeli, Benefizkonzert Karmelitenkirche Linz - CD/DVD issued by the choir, 2006.
 Thomas Kerbl, Männerchorvereinigung Bruckner 08, Anton Bruckner, Männerchöre – CD: LIVA027, 2008
 Philipp Ahmann, MDR Rundfunkchor Leipzig, Anton Bruckner & Michael Haydn - Motets – SACD: Pentatone PTC 5186 868, 2021

References

Sources 
 August Göllerich, Anton Bruckner. Ein Lebens- und Schaffens-Bild,  – posthumous edited by Max Auer by G. Bosse, Regensburg, 1932
 Anton Bruckner – Sämtliche Werke, Band XXI: Kleine Kirchenmusikwerke, Musikwissenschaftlicher Verlag der Internationalen Bruckner-Gesellschaft, Hans Bauernfeind and Leopold Nowak (Editor), Vienna, 1984/2001
 Cornelis van Zwol, Anton Bruckner 1824–1896 – Leven en werken, uitg. Thoth, Bussum, Netherlands, 2012. 
 Crawford Howie, Anton Bruckner - A documentary biography, online revised edition
 Uwe Harten, Anton Bruckner. Ein Handbuch. , Salzburg, 1996.

External links 
 
 
 Inveni David f-Moll, WAB 19 Critical discography by Hans Roelofs 
 Live performances can be heard on YouTube:
 Rutgers University Glee Club, NJ: Inveni David
 Jonas Rannila with the Manifestum Men's Choir: Inveni David (WAB 19)

Motets by Anton Bruckner
1868 compositions
Compositions in F minor